is a railway station in the city of Yurihonjō, Akita Prefecture,  Japan, operated by JR East.

Lines

Station layout
The station has one side platform and one island platform connected to the station building by a footbridge. The station is unattended.

Platforms

History
Michikawa Station opened on February 22, 1922 as a station on the Japanese Government Railways (JGR) Rikuusai Line, serving the village of Michikawa, Akita. It was switched to the control of the JGR Uetsu Main Line on April 20, 1924. The JGR became the JNR (Japan National Railway) after World War II. With the privatization of the JNR on April 1, 1987, the station came under the control of the East Japan Railway Company.

Surrounding area
 
 Site of Iwaki Castle

See also
List of railway stations in Japan

External links

 JR East Station information 

Railway stations in Japan opened in 1920
Railway stations in Akita Prefecture
Uetsu Main Line
Yurihonjō